I (also called Sahg I or  Sahg 1 ) is the debut album by the Norwegian doom metal band Sahg, released on March 1, 2006, under the Swedish record label Regain Records.

The artwork for the album was created single-handedly by the band members, and the video for "Godless Faith" was shot in October the same year, and was directed by Tommy Naess.

Sahg I entered the Norwegian charts at no. 31, and garnered some rave reviews across Europe.

Track listing

Personnel

Sahg 
Olav Iversen - Vocals, Guitar
Thomas Tofthagen - Guitars
King -  Bass
Kvitrafn - Drums, Throat-singing (Track 1)

Guest/session musicians 
Brynjulv Guddal - Percussion, Flute, Organ, Piano, Synthesizers

Production and engineering 
The Twin Axe Warriors - Art direction
The Pre-Apocalyptic Sorcerer  - Artwork
Tommy Næss - Photography
Hans Peter Klasson - Photography
Brynjulv Guddal - Producer, Recording, Mixing
Peter In de Betou – Mastering
 Recorded and mixed in Earshot Studio, Bergen, Norway
Mastered at Tailormaid Productions

References

External links 
Discogs.com
Metallum Archives

2006 debut albums
Sahg albums
Regain Records albums